Jillaroo may refer to:

Jillaroo (trainee), young woman in training on a cattle station or sheep station in Australia
Australia women's national rugby league team in international competition
Australian women's under 21 field hockey;  see Australian national sports team nicknames

See also
Jackaroo (disambiguation)
Cowgirl (disambiguation)
Gillaroo, trout species found in Ireland

Australian English